In the 1973 Virginia gubernatorial election, incumbent Governor A. Linwood Holton, Jr., a Republican, was unable to seek re-election due to term limits. Mills E. Godwin, Jr., former Democratic Governor of Virginia, was nominated by the Republican Party to run against Independent Lieutenant Governor of Virginia Henry Howell. The Democrats did not field a candidate, mostly choosing to support Howell's candidacy.

This was the last time until 2013 in which a member of the incumbent President's party was elected Governor of Virginia. It was also the last time a non-Democrat won the city of Alexandria.

Candidates
Mills E. Godwin, Jr., former Governor of Virginia (R)
Henry Howell, Lieutenant Governor of Virginia (I)

Results

References

Gubernatorial
1973
Virginia
November 1973 events in the United States